Neoneura is a genus of damselfly in the threadtail family Protoneuridae. They are found in the Neotropics, from Cuba and Texas to Argentina.

Characteristics
Though part of the threadtail family, the abdomen of neoneurans, in contrast to that of protoneurans, is no more slender than that of pond damselflies. Males are mostly brightly coloured with red, orange, yellow and blue predominating, but females are less showy. The females do not bend their relatively short abdomens when laying eggs as do protoneurans. Pairs of these damselfly can be seen in tandem over quiet waters at the edges of lakes. The eggs are laid among floating wood chippings or on emergent plant stems, the male remaining in tandem with the female while ovipositing takes place.

Species
The genus contains the following species:
Neoneura aaroni  - Coral-fronted Threadtail
Neoneura amelia  - Amelia's Threadtail
Neoneura anaclara 
Neoneura angelensis 
Neoneura bilinearis 
Neoneura carnatica  - Orange-sided Threadtail, Tiger Threadtail
Neoneura cristina 
Neoneura confundens 
Neoneura denticulata 
Neoneura desana 
Neoneura esthera 
Neoneura ethela 
Neoneura fulvicollis 
Neoneura gaida 
Neoneura joana 
Neoneura jurzitzai 
Neoneura kiautai 
Neoneura leonardoi 
Neoneura lucas 
Neoneura luzmarina 
Neoneura maria  - Cuban Blue Threadtail
Neoneura mariana 
Neoneura moorei 
Neoneura myrthea 
Neoneura paya 
Neoneura rubriventris 
Neoneura rufithorax 
Neoneura schreiberi 
Neoneura sylvatica 
Neoneura waltheri

References

Protoneuridae
Taxonomy articles created by Polbot